The Tong Ren Tower is a building in Nanjing, Jiangsu, China. Construction began in 2003 and ended in 2007. The building was designed by P & T Architects & Engineers Ltd. A 68 storey building design for this site was cancelled in 1996. However, it was redesigned and that resulted in its approval. The building is used for offices.

See also
List of tallest buildings in China

References

Skyscraper office buildings in Nanjing